NGC 363 is a lenticular galaxy in the constellation Cetus. It was discovered on November 28, 1885 by Francis Leavenworth. It was described by Dreyer as "extremely faint, extremely small, round."

References

0363
18851128
Cetus (constellation)
Lenticular galaxies
003911